Mundlapati Ramanadha Rao was an Indian nationalist, social worker and freedom fighter from Andhra Pradesh.

Political career

Rao was fascinated as a child by Mahatma Gandhi's ideology  of non-violence. He joined the campaign for Indian independence. He entered the Khadi movement and spent six months in Sabarmati Ashram with Gandhi at the age of 26.

He worked for rural development after independence. Apart from this he focused on Penuganchiprolu mandal in Krishna district.

With the public support he was elected as Society President unanimously for three decades (from 1955 to 1986 around).

He also kept his efforts for the construction of the Nagarjuna Sagar Dam and Pulichintala Project along with his friend Muktyala Raja.

References

Sakshi/29 May/ Jaggaiahpet edition/Ramanadham Mruthi

Eenadu/10 June/ Jaggayyapet edition "Neti taram Ramanadhanni adarsham ga teskovali"-Suryadevara Nageswar Rao CPI District Leader

Andhrajyothi/10 June/Jaggayyapet edition/"Ramanadhaniki ghanamga nevali"-Y.S.R. Congress Leader Samineni Udayabhanu

Sakshi/10 June/ Jaggayyapet edition/"Ramanadham sevalu maruvalenivi"-Y.S.R. Congress Leader Samineni Udayabhanu
Mallela Padbhanabham, Suryadevara, Sriram Tathayya, Nettem Raghu ram, Samineni viswanadham, jhon Kotayah

External links
  by Sakshi paper
  by Eenadu paper

1922 births
2011 deaths
Social workers from Andhra Pradesh
Social workers
Politicians from Vijayawada
Indian National Congress politicians from Andhra Pradesh
20th-century Indian politicians